Emotional Eternal is the third studio album by French psychedelic pop band Melody's Echo Chamber. It was released on 29 April 2022 on Domino Records.

Reception

At Metacritic, which assigns a normalised rating out of 100 to reviews from mainstream critics, Emotional Eternal received an average score of 77, based on 7 reviews, indicating "generally favorable reviews". The album also received a 7.1 aggregate on AnyDecentMusic?.

Track listing

Personnel 
All personnel credits adapted from album liner notes.

 Melody Prochet – production
 Matt Colton - mastering
 Matthew Cooper - design
 Fredrik Swahn – production, mixing
 Reine Fiske – production, mixing
 Gustav Ejstes – organ (track 7), piano and flute (track 8)
 Moussa Fadera – drums (track 3)
 Johan Holmegard – drums (track 8)
 Josefin Runsteen – strings (track 5)
 Diane Sagnier - photography
 Drew Tetz    - phenakistoscope

References

External links 

2022 albums
Domino Recording Company albums
Melody's Echo Chamber albums